Ten Little Wizards is a novel by Michael Kurland featuring Randall Garrett's alternate history detective Lord Darcy. It was first published in paperback by Ace Books in 1988.

The Lord Darcy stories are set in an alternate world whose history supposedly diverged from our own during the reign of King Richard the Lionheart, in which King John never reigned and most of western Europe and the Americas are united in an Angevin Empire whose continental possessions were never lost by that king. In this world a magic-based technology has developed in place of the science of our own world.

The title is an allusion to Agatha Christie's Ten Little Niggers, also published as Ten Little Indians, a classic of detective literature which is now almost always referred to by its US title, And Then There Were None.

Plot summary
Someone is killing wizards, and doing so apparently without the use of magic. Lord Darcy is sent to investigate. He must uncover the murderer and ascertain whether the whole business is a ploy to kill the king himself.

To complicate matters Darcy must investigate during the preparations for the investiture of Gwiliam, Duke of Lancaster (King John IV's younger son), as Prince of Gaul. To add international tension, the Crown Prince of Poland,  His Majesty the King of Courland (Latvia), will attend the ceremony. (In this timeline, Poland is a great empire ruling most of Eastern Europe, and there is an ongoing cold war between it and Darcy's Anglo-French Empire).

External links
Michael Kurland

Lord Darcy novels
1988 American novels
Novels by Michael Kurland
American alternate history novels
Ace Books books
Cultural depictions of Richard I of England